Bernard Edgar LeGresley (August 20, 1940 – September 7, 2007) was a Canadian politician. He served in the Legislative Assembly of New Brunswick from 1974 to 1982 as a Liberal member from the constituency of Miramichi Bay.

References

1940 births
2007 deaths